Platerodrilus ruficollis is a species of trilobite beetle found in Malaysia and Singapore, also known by its junior synonym, Duliticola hoiseni.

References 

Lycidae
Beetles of Asia
Insects of Malaysia
Insects of Singapore
Taxa named by Maurice Pic
Beetles described in 1942